Hiroyuki Noritake (則竹裕之, Noritake Hiroyuki; born August 27, 1964) is a Japanese jazz fusion drummer and a lecturer at the Showa Academia Musicae.

Career 
He started playing drums under the influence of his father who was a jazz drummer, and joined T-Square after being scouted in 1985 while attending Kobe University. He has appeared in the Playboy Jazz Festival and was won the Japan Gold Disc Award for the Jazz category ten times.

In 2000, he left with bassist Mitsuru Sutoh and T-Square disbanded for a little before reconvening months later, and he participated in live performances and recordings as support member for the band as well as for former member Masato Honda's band and solo career. He is also active in other sessions such as Honda's band and Aonori with Tomohito Aoki, who became familiar with Honda's support. In addition, he learned how to compose during his time as a drummer for T-Square and provided tracks like "Yuh-Ja."

In 2004, he formed Synchronized DNA, a twin drum unit with former Casiopea drummer Akira Jimbo. At the end of the same year, he also participated in the Casiopea's tour, in which Jimbo was now a supporting member, as Synchronized DNA. In 2005, he released the DVD "Double Drum Performance" and went on a live house tour to commemorate it. In July, he rejoined the Casiopea tour. The unit toured in Canada and performed at the Montreal Drum Festival. In 2006, along with Honda on saxophone, Keiji Matsumoto on keyboard, and Mitsuru Sutoh on bass, they formed Masato Honda with Voice of Elements, a band in which all members were former T-SQUARE members.

In addition to leading the Japanese jazz fusion world as a regular member of the Sadao Watanabe Quintet, Kazumi Watanabe Jazz Return Project, and Dimension, he has been a supporting member of pop singer Ayaka Hirahara's backing band since 2010.

References 

1964 births
Living people